Only a Dream may refer to:
 "Only a Dream" (The Kinks song), 1993
 "Only a Dream" (Zella Day song), 2020